Terekeka is a community in Central Equatoria, South Sudan. It is the headquarters of Terekeka County. 

Terekeka town lies on the western bank of the Nile, 53 miles north of Juba town. It is almost the capital of the Mundari also known as the Mondari or Mandari people.

References

Populated places in Central Equatoria
Populated places on the Nile